
Gmina Rogoźno is an urban-rural gmina (administrative district) in Oborniki County, Greater Poland Voivodeship, in west-central Poland.

Villages
Apart from the town of Rogoźno, Gmina Rogoźno contains the villages and settlements of Budziszewko, Cieśle, Dziewcza Struga, Garbatka, Gościejewo, Grudna, Jaracz, Józefinowo, Karolewo, Kaziopole, Laskowo, Marlewo, Międzylesie, Nienawiszcz, Nowy Młyn, Olszyna, Owczegłowy, Owieczki, Parkowo, Pruśce, Ruda, Sierniki, Słomowo, Stare, Studzieniec, Szczytno, Tarnowo, Wełna, Wojciechowo and Żołędzin.

Neighbouring gminas
Gmina Rogoźno is bordered by the gminas of Budzyń, Murowana Goślina, Oborniki, Ryczywół, Skoki and Wągrowiec.

References
Polish official population figures 2006

Rogozno
Oborniki County